Sanyawan station is a station on Line 10 of Chongqing Rail Transit in Chongqing municipality, China. It is located in Yubei District and opened in 2017.

Station structure
There are 2 island platforms at this station, located separately on two floors. On each floor, only one side of the platforms is used for Local trains to stop, while the other side is used for Rapid trains to pass through.

References

Railway stations in Chongqing
Railway stations in China opened in 2017
Chongqing Rail Transit stations